Cristóbal Ignacio del Solar Leefhelm (born 11 October 1993) is a Chilean professional golfer.

Del Solar played college golf at Florida State University, where he won one event, and was named to the All-ACC Team following his junior season.

Del Solar began his professional career on the PGA Tour Canada in 2017, where he played six events. In 2018, he was the medalist at the PGA Tour Latinoamérica qualifying tournament in Argentina. His first professional win came in the 2018 Center Open, which he won by five strokes. Returning to the PGA Tour Latinoamérica in 2019, Del Solar won the Puerto Plata Open for his second career win as a professional.

Amateur wins
2009 Abierto Juvenil De Chile
2010 Abierto Juvenil De Chile
2017 Irish Creek Collegiate

Source:

Professional wins (4)

PGA Tour Latinoamérica wins (4)

Team appearances
Eisenhower Trophy (representing Chile): 2012

References

External links
 
 

Chilean male golfers
Florida State Seminoles men's golfers
1993 births
Living people
21st-century Chilean people